Etxegoien is a hamlet and council located in the municipality of Aiara, in Álava province, Basque Country, Spain. As of 2020, it has a population of 15.

Geography 
Echegoyen is located 43km northwest of Vitoria-Gasteiz.

References

Populated places in Álava